Saurita fumosa is a moth in the subfamily Arctiinae. It was described by Schaus in 1912. It is found in Costa Rica.

References

Natural History Museum Lepidoptera generic names catalog

Moths described in 1912
Saurita